Salim Yusuf Shittu Abdallah, is a Kenyan defender currently in the ranks of Kenyan Premier League side Nairobi City Stars. He formerly turned out for Bukembe Academy, Ligi Ndogo S.C., Sofapaka, Posta Rangers, and AFC Leopards.

Career
Salim joined lower-tier side Ligi Ndogo in 2011, after being scouted from Bungoma-based Bukembe Academy. At the end of the year 2012, he moved to Premier League side Sofapaka F.C. on a four-year contract. He was then sent on loan to Posta Rangers at the start of the year 2013. The loan move was later made permanent. 

In 2017, Salim joined AFC Leopards on a two-year deal. Upon expiry of that contract, he was handed a three-year deal but after only six months he was released by the club.

He joined Nairobi City Stars in August 2019, for a season after the arrival of Bosnian UEFA Pro coach Sanjin Alagic. He extended his stay  at the club for a further two years after the team gained promotion to the Kenyan Premier League.

Honours

Club
Posta Rangers
National Super League
 Champions (1): 2015
AFC Leopards
GOtv Shield
 Champions (1): 2017
Nairobi City Stars
National Super League
 Champions (1): 2019-20

Individual
Kenyan Premier League
 Player of the Week (1): May 2021 (Nairobi City Stars)

References

External links
 

1990 births
Living people
Nairobi City Stars players
Ligi Ndogo S.C. players
Posta Rangers F.C. players
A.F.C. Leopards players
Kenyan footballers
Kenyan Premier League players